The Sylvester K. Pierce House, also known as the SK Pierce Victorian Haunted Mansion or just the Victorian Haunted Mansion, is an historic house at 4 West Broadway in Gardner, Massachusetts.  Build 1873-1875 for a local chair manufacturer, it is a prominent local example of Second Empire architecture, and is well known for reports of hauntings.  It was listed on the National Register of Historic Places in 2022. The historic mansion was listed for sale for $329,000 in late 2022.

Description and history
The Pierce House is located in the village center of South Gardner, on the south side of West Broadway at the junction with South Main Street. It has 11 foot ceilings, 10 bedrooms, 2.5 baths, and its main block is a -story frame structure, with a mansard roof and clapboarded exterior.  A four-story tower, also topped by a mansard roof, rises from the center bay of the front facade.  The main facade is three bays wide, with projecting polygonal window bays of decreasing size to the left of the tower, and paired sash windows to the right.  The entrance is flanked by paneled posts which support the tower and provide an entrance shelter.  The exterior of the building has elaborately detailed woodwork, a feature that continues inside, where most of the original woodwork and hardware have been preserved.

The house was build in 1873-75 for Sylvester K. Pierce (1820-1888), a native of Westminster who moved to Gardner, and became involved in the locally prominent chair manufacturing business.  He purchased his own factory at the age of 25, located across the street from the site of this house, which became one of the city's most successful businesses of the period.  This house was designed and built for his family by E. Boyden & Son, a prominent Worcester architect, and took three years of painstakingly detailed work to complete.  Pierce's son converted the house into a inn, with visitors including former United States President Calvin Coolidge, artist Norman Rockwell, and a number of stars of stage and screen.  The building declined during the 20th century, but its features were sufficiently preserved that an early 21st century restoration restored it to its previous grandeur.  The current owners offer tours of the house, and opportunities to spend the night in search of alleged hauntings.

See also
National Register of Historic Places listings in northern Worcester County, Massachusetts

External links
House web site

References

Houses in Worcester County, Massachusetts
Buildings and structures in Gardner, Massachusetts
National Register of Historic Places in Worcester, Massachusetts
Houses on the National Register of Historic Places in Worcester County, Massachusetts